Dihi Bayara (also written as Dihi Bayra)  is a village in the Arambagh CD block  in the Arambagh subdivision of Hooghly district in the Indian state of West Bengal.

Geography

Location
Dihi Bayara is located at

Area overview
The Arambagh subdivision, presented in the map alongside, is divided into two physiographic parts – the Dwarakeswar River being the dividing line. The western part is upland and rocky – it is extension of the terrain of neighbouring Bankura district. The eastern part is flat alluvial plain area.  The railways, the roads and flood-control measures have had an impact on the area. The area is overwhelmingly rural with 94.77% of the population living in rural areas and 5.23% of the population living in urban areas.

Note: The map alongside presents some of the notable locations in the subdivision. All places marked in the map are linked in the larger full screen map.

Demographics
As per the 2011 Census of India, Dihi Bayara had a total population of 3,697 of which 1,858 (50%) were males and 1,839 (50%) were females. Population in the age range 0–6 years was 389. The total number of literate persons in Dihi Bayara was 2,506 (75.76% of the population over 6 years).

Culture
David J. McCutchion mentions the Dharma temple as an at chala, 19th century Midnapore type, built in 1858 and measuring 15’ 9" x 14’ 4".  The archway panels and smaller panels round the façade are filled with terracotta figures.

Dihi Bayara picture gallery

References

External links

Villages in Hooghly district